The Book of Nestor the Priest, originally titled Account of the Disputation of the Priest (Qissat Mujadalat al-Asquf ) or its Hebrew textual avatar Sefer Nestor Ha-Komer  (written c. 900 CE) is thought to be the earliest surviving anti-Christian Jewish polemic. The original version of the book was written in Judeo-Arabic (Arabic written in Hebrew script with  religious terms in their original Hebrew.) and also a translation to Hebrew which confused  an opening quote from Nestorius with the name of the author of the book, who is actually unknown.  It cites extensively and critically from the New Testament and Church sources. The title komer (כומר) describes a Christian priest (in modern Hebrew the word is used both for Catholic or Orthodox priests and for Protestant ministers), rather than a kohen or Jewish priest. The text is written as the story of a Christian priest (wrongly named Nestor in the Hebrew translation) who converted to Judaism and wrote a critical account of the fundamental Christian doctrine regarding the nature of Jesus and the Trinity.

The text uses the spelling Yeshu (ישו) for Jesus.

A modern edition  פולמוס נסתור הכומר The Polemic of Nestor the Priest by Daniel J. Lasker and Sarah Stroumsa was published by the Ben-Zvi Institute for the Study of Jewish Communities in the East, 1996.

See also
 Toledot Yeshu
 Milhamoth ha-Shem of Jacob Ben Reuben 12C
 Sefer Nizzahon Yashan or Nizzahon vetus 13C
 Sefer Joseph Hamekane of R. Joseph hen R. Nathan l'official 13C (Paris MS)
 The Touchstone of Ibn Shaprut

References

Books about Jesus
Jewish medieval literature
Jewish–Christian debate
Hebrew manuscripts
Books critical of Christianity
Jewish apologetics
10th-century Arabic books
Judeo-Arabic literature